Caltagirone is an inland city and  in the Metropolitan City of Catania, on the island (and region) of Sicily, southern Italy, about  southwest of Catania. It is the fifth most populous municipality of the Metropolitan City, behind Catania, Acireale, Misterbianco and Paternò. Alongside Catania, it is the only town who is seat of a tribunal in the former province. Since 1987, the comune has obtained the City title, through presidential act. After Caltanissetta, it is the second most populous  in Central Sicily.

The town is a  production center of pottery, particularly maiolica and terra-cotta wares. Nowadays, the production is more and more oriented to artistic production of ceramics and terra-cotta sculptures. Other activities are mainly related to agriculture (production of grapes, olives, peaches), third-sector activities and tourism.

History
The city's name derives from the Arabic  ("castle of [pottery] jars") – a name that attests to the antiquity of the pottery works which are still thriving. It has been inhabited since prehistoric times, as shown by the presence of two necropoleis dating from the second millennium BCE and by numerous other archaeological finds. It was later inhabited by the Sicels pre-Roman population.

The Arabs built a castle here that in 1030 was attacked by Ligurian troops under the Byzantine general George Maniakes, who have left traces of Ligurian language in the current dialect. The city flourished under the Norman and Hohenstaufen domination, becoming a renowned center for production of ceramics.

The city was almost completely destroyed by the earthquake of 1693. Many public and private buildings were then  reconstructed in a Sicilian Baroque style. Primarily for this reason the city has been included, together with the surrounding territory, in an area protected by the UNESCO World Heritage program.

In May 29, 1860, the town was looted by the Bourbon army led by general Gaetano Afan de Rivera, while fleeing from the Garibaldini forces towards Catania. 

During the first part of the XX Century, it was the house of Italian Christian democracy, due to the presence of renowned politician Luigi Sturzo. Later, the town expressed various nationwide politician, such as Italian Prime minister Mario Scelba, and Sicilian president Silvio Milazzo.

Today, Caltagirone is a mid-tier Sicilian town. It is one of the 25 most populous town in Sicily, and one of the 250 most populous in Italy.

Geography
The municipality borders with Acate (RG), Gela (CL), Grammichele, Licodia Eubea, Mazzarino (CL), Mazzarrone, Mineo, Mirabella Imbaccari, Niscemi (CL), Piazza Armerina (EN) and San Michele di Ganzaria. Its hamlets (frazioni) of Albanazzo, Colleggiata (or Collegiata), Favarella, Granieri, Mulino Buongiovanni, Piano Carbone, Piano San Paolo, Rangasia, San Basilio – Casa Prete, San Mauro, Santo Pietro, Serra Fornazzo, Signore del Soccorso, Villa Gravina and Villa Grazia.

Main sights

A collection of ancient and modern pottery and terra-cotta, dating back to the Magna Grecia period, is available in the local Museum of Pottery, created in 1965.

The main landmark of the city is the 142-step monumental Staircase of Santa Maria del Monte, built from 1608 in the old part of the town. The peculiarity is that each step is decorated with different hand-decorated ceramics, using styles and figures derived from the millennial tradition of pottery making. Once a year, on and around the day of the city's patron saint, (St. James, 25 July), the staircase is illuminated with candles of different colours arranged in order to reconstruct an artistic drawing of several tens of meters.

Religious buildings include:
San Giuliano: Cathedral of Norman origin, dedicated to St Julian, with a twentieth-century art nouveau façade by Saverio Gulli.
San Francesco di Paola: Baroque church; the sacristy is in Gothic style, dating from before the 1693 earthquake.
San Francesco: Church dedicated to St Francis of Assisi, built originally in 1236 and rebuilt in Baroque style after 1693. The façade has two orders with marine symbols and a statue of the Immaculate. The dome is unfinished.
Chiesa del Gesù: Church of Jesus, built by Jesuits. (1570). The façade has eight statues portraying saints and the Madonna with Child. The interior, one a single nave, houses a Pietà by Filippo Paladino (1607) and Christ's Nativity by Polidoro da Caravaggio.
Santa Maria di Gesù: adjacent to Franciscan convent, with Madonna statue by Gagini
Santa Maria del Monte (12th century).
 The Renaissance Church of the New Capuchins, in white stone, with a noteworthy treasure and a picture gallery.
San GiacomoSan Giorgio'' - church contains an altarpiece attributed to Rogier van der Weyden
 Also noteworthy is the Palazzo Senatorio (15th century), the former Town Hall.

People
 Don Luigi Sturzo (1871–1959), founder of the Italian People's Party (Italian: Partito Popolare Italiano, later Democrazia Cristiana). It is one of the most important Italian statists and politician since the inception of the unitary State.
 Mario Scelba (1901–1991), Minister of the Interior and Prime Minister of Italy from February 1954 to July 1955.
 Silvio Milazzo (1903–1982), President of the Regional Government of Sicily in 1958–1960.
 Vincent Drucci (1898–1927), Chicago North Side Gang boss, born here in 1898.
 Giuseppe Mascara (1979–), football player, born here in 1979. He played in Serie A, Italian national team and UEFA Champions League.

Sister cities
  Rijeka, Croatia
  San Francisco, USA
  Arnsberg, Germany

See also
Sant'Ippolito (hill)
Diocese of Caltagirone
Caltagirone Ceramics

References

External links

 Caltagirone official website
 Caltagirone on sentieridelbarocco.it

 
Municipalities of the Metropolitan City of Catania
World Heritage Sites in Italy